When the Young Wine Blossoms is a 1943 German comedy film directed by Fritz Kirchhoff and starring Henny Porten, Otto Gebühr and René Deltgen. It was based on a play by the Norwegian writer Bjørnstjerne Bjørnson which had previously been adapted into a 1927 German silent film of the same title.

The film's sets were designed by the art directors Franz Bi and Bruno Lutz. It was shot in various locations across Germany including the Seddiner See and the city of Hamburg.

Synopsis
An interfering mother plans husbands for her three daughters as they come of marriageable age. However she pays no attention to her daughters own feeling until the eventual intervention of her husband manages to bring things to a happy conclusion.

Cast
 Henny Porten as Elisa Arvik
 Otto Gebühr as Wilhelm Arvik
 René Deltgen as Kapitän Tonning
 Marina von Ditmar as Marna Arvik
 Geraldine Katt as Alberta Arvik
 Else von Möllendorff as Helene Arvik
 Hans Zesch-Ballot as Dr. Hall
 Marina Ried as Astrid
 Peter Elsholtz as Reeder Karstens
 Wilhelm König as Ulrik Jörgensen, Maler
 Eduard von Winterstein as Petersen
 Fritz Staudte as Roll
 Paul Rehkopf as Lorenz
 Claire Reigbert as Tante Anna
 Else Ehser as Sophie
 Ingeborg Stoldt as Magd
 Günther Ballier as Ausstellungsleiter
 Else Reval as Dicke Dame

References

Bibliography 
 Bock, Hans-Michael & Bergfelder, Tim. The Concise Cinegraph: Encyclopaedia of German Cinema. Berghahn Books, 2009.

External links 
 

1943 films
1943 comedy films
Films of Nazi Germany
German comedy films
1940s German-language films
Films directed by Fritz Kirchhoff
Terra Film films
German black-and-white films
Films scored by Eduard Künneke
1940s German films